This is a list of Mickey Spillane's Mike Hammer episodes.

Series overview

Episodes

TV Movie 1 (1983)

Season 1 (1984)

Season 2 (1984–85)

TV Movie 2 (1986)

The New Mike Hammer, Season 3 (1986–87)

TV Movie 3 (1989)

References

External links 
 
 

Mickey Spillane's Mike Hammer
Mike Hammer (character)